Crum Lynne station is a station on the SEPTA Wilmington/Newark Line. Though the station sits along the Northeast Corridor, it is not served by any Amtrak intercity services. The station, located at Chester Pike (US 13) & West Ridley Avenue in Ridley Park, Pennsylvania, is actually northeast of the community the station is named for. It was named by a then-Pennsylvania Railroad vice president after Crumlin, Wales, where his mother was born. It includes a 14-space parking lot, and sheltered platforms on both West Ridley Avenue and Chester Pike.

Station layout
Crum Lynne has two low-level side platforms with walkways connecting passengers to the inner tracks. Amtrak's Northeast Corridor lines bypass the station via the inner tracks.

References

External links
SEPTA – Crum Lynne Station
2003 Mike Pizzano Photo
 Chester Pike entrance from Google Maps Street View

SEPTA Regional Rail stations
Stations on the Northeast Corridor
Railway stations in Delaware County, Pennsylvania
Wilmington/Newark Line